Ridgely's Delight is an historic residential neighborhood in Baltimore, Maryland, United States. Its borders are formed by Russell and Greene Streets to the east, West Pratt Street to the north, and Martin Luther King Jr. Boulevard from the western to southern tips. It is adjacent to the University of Maryland, Baltimore, Oriole Park at Camden Yards, and M&T Bank Stadium. It is situated a short walk from MARC Train and the Light Rail's Camden Station, which has made it a popular residence of Washington, D.C. and suburban Baltimore commuters. It is within a 5-minute walk of both Oriole Park at Camden Yards and M&T Bank Stadium and a 10-minute walk from Baltimore's historic Inner Harbor.

The land tract of Ridgley's Delight was surveyed in 1732 for Charles Ridgley.

In 1792, James McHenry purchased a  tract from Ridgely's Delight and named it Fayetteville in honor of his friend Lafayette.

With its name derived from Charles Ridgely II's plantation Ridgely's Whim, Ridgely's Delight was originally inhabited by craftspeople but later became home to affluent professionals who used their resources to make the rowhouses more ornate.

Ridgely's Delight is the birthplace of Babe Ruth and home to the Babe Ruth Birthplace Museum on Emory Street. Several bars and shops are located in the neighborhood, most popularly Quigley's Half-Irish Pub, Camden Pub, Corner Bistro & Wine Bar, and Peace and a Cup of Joe.

References

External links
Ridgely's Delight Association
"A revived charmer still a secret", Baltimore Sun
, including photo from 1984 and boundary map, at Maryland Historical Trust
Ridgely's Delight listing at CHAP includes map
Demographics from Neighborhood Indicators Alliance

Central Baltimore
Neighborhoods in Baltimore
Historic districts on the National Register of Historic Places in Baltimore
Baltimore National Heritage Area